Milo McCabe (born Michael Patrick McCabe; 5 June 1976) is a British television presenter, actor and stand-up character comedian.

Early life
McCabe was born in Kingston upon Thames to Mike McCabe. His father was a comedian of New Faces fame and appeared on The Comedians.

Career
Milo McCabe has a BA (Hons) degree in Psychotherapy from the University of Liverpool and studied towards an MSc in Transactional Analysis.  McCabe also studied Meisner Technique Acting at Impulse Theatre Company where he met Tim Booth.  McCabe became a drummer for Tim Booth and the Individuals and in 2004 played Glastonbury Festival, T in the Park, V Festival and Benicassim (Festival Internacional de Benicàssim) alongside Morrissey, The Killers and The Strokes.

McCabe has presented ITV2's Dare and presented 3 episodes of ITV1's The Mint, then moved on to present its spin-off show Mint Extra on ITV Play from September 9, 2006. He has further presenting credits on Current TV.

Other shows McCabe has been involved with include The A-Z of Sexual Fetishes for Five, Rob Brydon's Annually Retentive for BBC Three and Live At The Electric for BBC Three.

McCabe regularly performs around the UK and internationally on the stand-up scene.

In 2011 McCabe performed his Edinburgh Fringe Festival chat show, Get Brown at the Gilded Balloon, Edinburgh, featuring 3 new characters, Nobbo Johnson, an Aussie Rules legend turned art critic; Tyson Moon, following in his "Father's Footsteps" as the son of an old school comedian and Anthony Sixsmith, a camp Liverpudlian bongo healer; alongside Maff Brown as the show's vitriolic host and Will Sentance as Floor Manager. Long standing McCabe creation Philberto also features as the unappreciated warm up guy. His show received 4* reviews.

In 2018 McCabe performed a sell out run of his show '1001 Moments with Troy Hawke' then brought the show to the 2019 Perth Fringe World Festival, where it won a weekly comedy award and was shortlisted for the best comedy main award.

In 2020 McCabe started his own internet call in show (Troy Tawke), this ran for several episodes during the COVID-19 pandemic's earlier lockdown weeks, finishing as lockdown restrictions were eased.

Television work
The A-Z of Sexual Fetishes (Five) - 2005
Quiznation- 2006
Rob Brydon's Annually Retentive (BBC Three) - 2006
The Mint - 1 April 2006
Live At The Electric (BBC Three)- June 2011
Blue Go Mad In Ibiza (ITV2) January 2015. Character: Juan (Spanish police officer)
Benidorm (TV series) (ITV1) - 15th Feb 2016 - Spanish Police Officer

External links
Website
Agent
Edinburgh 2012
Facebook
Twitter
Troy Hawke Facebook

References

British television presenters
Living people
Year of birth missing (living people)